Acacia fodinalis is a tree belonging to the genus Acacia and the subgenus Juliflorae that is native to north eastern Australia.

Description
It has reddish coloured and sharply angular branchlets that are resinous when the tree is young. Like most species of Acacia it has phyllodes rather than true leaves. The evergreen phyllodes are slightly sickle shaped and taper equally to each end. When it blooms it produces simple inflorescences with a rather open cylindrical flower-spike that has a length of  containing  yellow flowers. Following flowering linear shaped, brown cloured seed pods for that are raised over seeds and slightly constricted between them.

Distribution
It is endemic to central eastern Queensland where it is found in the upper portion on the Isaac River watershed and adjacent parts of the Belyando River catchment where it usually situated on floodplains and riverbanks growing in sandy soils as a part of open Eucalyptus woodland communities and is mostly associated with Eucalyptus crebra.

See also
List of Acacia species

References

fodinalis
Flora of Queensland
Taxa named by Leslie Pedley
Plants described in 1999